The following is a list of episodes from the Colombian television series, The Queen of Flow.

Series overview

Episodes

Season 1 (2018)

Season 2 (2021)

References 

Queen of Flow